A by-election was held for the New South Wales Legislative Assembly electorate of Goldfields South on 16 November 1863 because Bowie Wilson had been appointed Secretary for Lands in the first Martin ministry. Such ministerial by-elections were usually uncontested and on this occasion, Peter Faucett (Yass), William Forster (East Sydney) and Arthur Holroyd (Parramatta) were unopposed. Of the other two contested elections, Geoffrey Eagar (West Sydney) was easily re-elected, with more than 90% of the vote, while James Martin was defeated at the Orange by-election. Martin promptly regained a seat in parliament by winning the by-election for The Tumut.

Frederick Cooper had been elected for Braidwood at the 1859 election, resigning in 1860, to accept an appointment as a sub-commissioner of goldfields. He was initially at Kiandra, however an inquiry had found he had committed errors, including illegal acts, as a result of his inexperience. Wilson, as member for Goldfields South, had been critical of the response of the then Secretary for Lands, John Robertson, in moving Cooper to Araluen rather than dismissing him. Cooper resigned as sub-commissioner shortly after Wilson had been appointed Secretary for Lands.

Dates

Polling places

Result

Bowie Wilson was appointed Secretary for Lands in the first Martin ministry.Returns were only reported for 8 of the 14 polling places.

See also
Electoral results for the district of Goldfields South
List of New South Wales state by-elections

Notes

References

1863 elections in Australia
New South Wales state by-elections
1860s in New South Wales